Fabio Frizzi (born 2 July 1951) is an Italian musician and composer. Born in Bologna, Emilia-Romagna, Italy, he is best known for his film scores and was a frequent collaborator with horror director Lucio Fulci.

Frizzi is the older brother of the late television presenter Fabrizio Frizzi.

Selected filmography
Solo

Finnish singer Taiska used the melody of Frizzi's composition "Ibo lele" for her song, "Mombasa".

With Bixio - Frizzi - Tempera

References

External links

Fabio Frizzi interviewed by Lionel Grenier for luciofulci.fr (in French)
Fabio Frizzi interviewed by Tim Fife for Cinema Suicide (in English)
Fabio Frizzi interview by Fangoria

1951 births
Living people
Musicians from Bologna
Italian film score composers
Italian male film score composers
20th-century Italian male musicians
21st-century Italian male musicians